John Isaiah Northrop, Ph.D. (12 October 1861 – 27 June 1891) was an American zoologist at Columbia University.

Biography
John I. Northrop was born in New York City. He was named after his father, John Isaiah Northrop, a pharmacist. His mother, Mary R. Havemeyer, was a sister of Frederic Christian Havemeyer, a graduate of Columbia College, after whom Havemeyer Hall is named. His father died when he was two years old. Northrop studied for some years at a private school in New Windsor, New York, then at the Columbia Grammar & Preparatory School, in which he prepared for the Columbia School of Mines. He graduated in 1884, with the degree of Engineer of Mines.

On June 28, 1889, he married Alice Belle Rich, at the time professor in Botany at the Hunter College. In 1891, almost exactly two years after his marriage, Dr. Northrop was killed in a laboratory explosion at the Columbia School of Mines. His only child, John Howard Northrop (Nobel Laureate in Chemistry, 1946), was born nine days after his father's death.

Works
(1887). Plant Notes from Temiscouata County, Canada.
(1888). Histology of Hoya Carnosa.
(1888). Fossil Leaves from Bridgeton, New Jersey.
(1910). A Naturalist in the Bahamas.

References

External links

Works by John I. Northrop, at Hathi Trust
Works by John I. Northrop, at JSTOR

1861 births
1891 deaths
American zoologists
Columbia School of Mines alumni
Columbia University faculty
Scientists from New York City
Deaths from laboratory accidents
Columbia Grammar & Preparatory School alumni
Havemeyer family